Are We Not Men? We Are Diva! is a cover album from punk rock supergroup Me First and the Gimme Gimmes.  The album consists of covers of songs originally performed by divas. It was released on May 13, 2014 on Fat Wreck Chords.

Prior to the album's release, the band put out two singles. The first was their cover of Paula Abdul's track "Straight Up". On May 5, they released a cover of Christina Aguilera's "Beautiful" as a second pre-release single.

Speaking about the album, guitarist Joey Cape said in an interview that "we always cover songs that one might consider to be guilty pleasures. 'Beautiful' clearly fits the bill. It is a great song but not necessarily something a fan of any of our bands would even consider." The title is a reference to Devo's album Q: Are We Not Men? A: We Are Devo!.

The album continues the band's tradition of marrying cover versions with elements of classic punk songs. For example, this album's version of "Speechless" borrows the intro to "Sonic Reducer" by Dead Boys, "On the radio" uses the intro to "Brickfield Nights" by The Boys, "Beautiful" uses the intro to "Superficial Love" by TSOL, "Straight Up" lifts the intro from "Evil" by 45 Grave, and "Karma Chameleon" uses the intro to "Everybody's Happy Nowadays" by Buzzcocks.

Critical reception

At Alternative Press, Brendan Manley rated the album four out of five stars, remarking how the band "achieves bona fide diva-dom, estrogen aside."

Track listing

Personnel
 Spike Slawson - vocals
 Chris Shiflett (a.k.a. Jake Jackson) - lead guitar
 Joey Cape - rhythm guitar
 Fat Mike - bass
 Dave Raun - drums

Additional musicians
 Samon Rajabnik - keyboards
 Jamin Barton - sax
 Joe Raposo - upright bass
 Darius Koski - accordion
 Eric Melvin - backing vocals
 Paddy Skinner - backing vocals

References

Me First and the Gimme Gimmes albums
2014 albums
Fat Wreck Chords albums